Pallippuram may refer to the following places in the state of Kerala, in India:

Pallippuram, Alappuzha
Pallippuram, Ernakulam
Pallippuram, Palakkad
Pallippuram, Thiruvananthapuram